Daphine Lydia Mirembe (born 14 August 1985) is a Ugandan politician. She is the district women's representative for Butambala District in the Parliament of Uganda. She won the seat in parliament in 2016 on an independent ticket after defeating Aisha Kabanda of the National resistance movement (NRM) at the 2016 Ugandan general elections.

Education 
Mirembe attended Kibibi secondary school for her 'O' level and 'A' level education. She attained her Uganda Certificate of Education in 2002 and Uganda Advanced Certificate of Education in 2004. She later joined the Makerere University Business School where she graduated with a Bachelor in Leisure and Hospitality Management in 2009.

Career 
Mirembe is  currently a member of parliament representing Butambala district as the district woman representative, a position she has held since 2016. In parliament, she serves on the committee on HIV/AIDS related disease and the committee on health. She is also a member of the Uganda Women Parliamentary Association where she serves on the sexual offences bill round table committee. She is also a member of the Buganda caucus in the parliament.

Before joining parliament Mirembe was serving in the capacity of director of Mirembe Foundation from 2013 to 2016. And earlier in her career was a banker with Orient Bank between 2011 and 2012.

References 

Members of the Parliament of Uganda
Makerere University alumni
1985 births
Living people
Women members of the Parliament of Uganda
21st-century Ugandan politicians
21st-century Ugandan women politicians